Black Devil is a Dutch brand of cigarettes, currently owned and manufactured by Heupink & Bloemen. The brand is especially popular amongst teen smokers.

In France
Since March 2010, flavoured cigarettes can no longer be sold in France in a bid by the French government to combat youth smoking. Thus, the Finest Flavour chocolate variant became the Grey Flavour and the filter is no longer sweet or flavoured with the taste of chocolate. The brand continues to sell flavoured cigarettes outside of France.

Packaging
All varieties are presented in a "rigid" package and the word black Devil in the center of the pack. There is also a logo consisting of a red circle with a stylized, black and smiling little devil, holding a silver fork. The three types of packets (Finest Flavour, Special Flavour, Pink) differ substantially for color: the first one is black, the second is gray, and the third is pink. The cigarettes and filter also have the colour of the package they are assigned with: black cigarettes for the black vanilla pack, pink cigarettes for the pink normal pack, green cigarettes for the green menthol pack, and so on.

Markets
Black Devil cigarettes are sold in the following countries: Belgium, Netherlands, Mozambique, Germany, France, Switzerland, Sweden, Austria, Italy, Poland, Slovenia, Latvia, Russia, Spain, Israel,
Myanmar, Taiwan, South Korea, Mongolia, Ukraine, Japan, and were formerly sold in Portugal.

Products
 Black Devil Chocolate Flavour
 Black Devil Special Flavour
 Black Devil Black
 Black Devil Pink
 Black Devil Yellow
 Black Devil Green (mint flavor)
 Black Devil Cherry
 Black Devil Ice 
 Black Devil Gold
 Black Devil Cafe

Below are all the current brands of Black Devil cigarettes sold, with the levels of tar, nicotine and carbon monoxide included.

See also

 Tobacco smoking

References

Cigarette brands